Events from the year 2004 in the European Union.

Incumbents
 Commission President
 Romano Prodi (to 22 November)
 José Manuel Barroso (since 22 November)
 Council Presidency
 Ireland (January–June)
 The Netherlands (July–December)
 Parliament President
 Pat Cox (to 30 July)
 Josep Borrell (since 30 July)
 High Representative
 Javier Solana

Events

 1 May: 2004 Enlargement.
 10–13 June: 2004 European Parliament election expanding the Commission.
 22 July: The European Parliament approves José Manuel Barroso as President.
 29 October: Delegates of the 25 member states sign the European Constitution in Rome.
 1 November: Original date for Barroso to enter office delayed due to parliamentary opposition to some of his Commissioners. A new college is later submitted.
 18 November: The European Parliament approves the Barroso Commission.
 22 November: Barroso Commission took office.

References

 
Years of the 21st century in the European Union
2000s in the European Union